Luigi Cecili (born 11 February 1902, date of death unknown) was an Italian racing cyclist. He rode in the 1926 Tour de France.

References

External links
 

1902 births
Year of death missing
Italian male cyclists
Place of birth missing